Patience Emily Tumusiime Rubagumya, (née Patience  Tumusiime), is a Ugandan lawyer, corporate executive and taxation expert, who serves as the Commissioner for Legal Services and Board Affairs at Uganda Revenue Authority (URA), Uganda's revenue collection agency. She was appointed to  that position on 1 February 2015, replacing Doris Akol, who was appointed Commissioner General of the URA. Rubagumya also doubles as the Company Secretary at the tax agency.

Background and education
She was born in Uganda and attended local elementary and secondary schools. She holds a Bachelor of Laws degree, awarded by Makerere University, Uganda's oldest and largest public university. She then obtained a Diploma in Legal practice, from the Law Development Centre. She was then admitted to the Uganda Bar, as a practicing attorney.

Her degree of Master of Laws in Oil and Gas, was obtained from Robert Gordon University, in Scotland. She also holds a Postgraduate Diploma in Taxation and Revenue Administration, awarded by the Uganda Revenue Authority Training School, in Kampala. She is a Fellow of the Institute of Chartered Secretaries and Administrators of England.

Career
Ms Rubagumya has spent nearly 20 years at the Uganda Revenue Authority, having taken up employment there in 2001. She rose through the ranks at the agency and was the Assistant Commissioner Board Affairs, Policy and Rulings at URA, prior to her current assignment. She was judged to be the best applicant in a field of four candidates who interviewed for the position.

In August 2017, at her current position, she was involved in the closure of three branches of Kenya-based Nakumatt Supermarkets, due to tax arrears amounting to "at least USh300 million (US$86,000), excluding accumulated interest for the past five years". That action effectively kicked Nakumatt out of Uganda.

Other considerations
In her position as "Commissioner for Legal Services and Board Affairs", she a member of "Senior Management" at URA. In her position as Company Secretary, she is a member of the board of directors of the tax agency.

See also
 Simon Kagugube
 Samallie Kiyingi
 Economy of Uganda

Succession table

References

External links
Website of Uganda Revenue Authority
URA procures Chinese firm for electronic invoicing As of 6 February 2019.

1978 births
Living people
Ugandan women lawyers
Makerere University alumni
Law Development Centre alumni
Alumni of Robert Gordon University
People from Western Region, Uganda
21st-century Ugandan lawyers
21st-century women lawyers